Adelpha is a genus of brush-footed butterflies found from the southern United States and Mexico to South America. They are commonly known as sisters, due to the white markings on their wings, which resemble a nun's habit. This genus is sometimes included with the admiral butterflies (Limenitis).

Species
Listed alphabetically within species group:

The alala species group:
Adelpha alala (Hewitson, 1847) – Alala sister
Adelpha aricia (Hewitson, 1847)
Adelpha corcyra (Hewitson, 1847)
Adelpha donysa (Hewitson, 1847) – montane sister
Adelpha pithys (Bates, 1864) – pithys sister
Adelpha tracta (Butler, 1872) – tracta sister

The capucinus species group:
Adelpha barnesia Schaus, 1902 – Barnes' sister
Adelpha capucinus (Walch, 1775) – capycinus sister
Adelpha epizygis Fruhstorfer, 1915
Adelpha fabricia Fruhstorfer, 1913

The cocala species group:
Adelpha argentea Willmott & Hall, 1995
Adelpha boreas (Butler, 1866) – gaudy sister
Adelpha cocala (Cramer, 1779) – cocala sister, orange-washed sister
Adelpha coryneta (Hewitson, 1874)
Adelpha erymanthis Godman & Salvin, 1884 – Godman's sister
Adelpha felderi (Boisduval, 1870) – rusty sister, Felder's sister
Adelpha irmina (Doubleday, 1848) – Irmina sister
Adelpha jordani (Fruhstorfer, 1913) – Jordan's sister
Adelpha justina (C. & R. Felder, 1861)
Adelpha lamasi Willmott & Hall, 1999
Adelpha leucophthalma (Latreille, 1809) – Veracruz sister
Adelpha levona Steinhauser & Miller, 1977
Adelpha milleri Beutelspacher, 1976 – cloistered sister
Adelpha olynthia (C. & R. Felder, 1867) – Olynthia sister
Adelpha rothschildi Fruhstorfer, 1913
Adelpha salus Hall, 1935 – lost sister
Adelpha saundersii (Hewitson, 1867) – Saunder's sister
Adelpha shuara Willmott & Hall, 1995
Adelpha sichaeus (Butler, 1866)
Adelpha stilesiana DeVries & Chacón, 1982
Adelpha zina (Hewitson, 1867) – Zina sister

The iphiclus species group:
Adelpha abyla (Hewitson, 1850) – Jamaican sister
Adelpha basiloides (Bates, 1865) – spot-celled sister
Adelpha calliphane Fruhstorfer, 1915
Adelpha falcipennis Fruhstorfer, 1915
Adelpha gavina Fruhstorfer, 1915
Adelpha iphicleola (Bates, 1864) – confusing sister
Adelpha iphiclus (Linnaeus, 1758) – pointed sister
Adelpha mythra (Godart, 1824) – Mythra sister
Adelpha plesaure Hübner, 1823 – pleasure sister
Adelpha poltius Hall, 1938
Adelpha thessalia (C. & R. Felder, 1867) – Thessalia sister
Adelpha thoasa (Hewitson, 1850) – thoasa sister

The phylaca species group:
Adelpha erotia (Hewitson, 1847) – stitched sister
Adelpha lycorias (Godart, 1824) – rayed sister
Adelpha mesentina (Cramer, 1777) – mesentina sister
Adelpha phylaca (Bates, 1866) – Cecropia sister
Adelpha messana (C. & R. Felder, 1867) – Messana or Thesprotia sister

The serpa species group:
Adelpha bredowii Geyer, 1837 – Bredow's sister
Adelpha californica (Butler, 1865) – California sister
Adelpha diocles Godman & Salvin, 1878 – tailed sister
Adelpha eulalia E. Doubleday, 1848) – Arizona sister
Adelpha herbita Weymer, 1907
Adelpha hyas (Doyère, 1840)
Adelpha nea (Hewitson, 1847) – Nea sister
Adelpha paraena (Bates, 1865) – Massilia sister, Bates' sister
Adelpha paroeca (Bates, 1864) – eyed sister
Adelpha radiata Fruhstorfer, 1915 – striated sister
Adelpha seriphia (C. & R. Felder, 1867) – dentate sister
Adelpha serpa (Boisduval, 1836) – celerio sister, celadon sister
Adelpha zea (Hewitson, 1850) – Zea sister

Ungrouped:
Adelpha abia (Hewitson, 1850)
Adelpha amazona Austin & Jasinski, 1999
Adelpha atlantica Willmott, 2003
Adelpha attica (C. & R. Felder, 1867) – Attica sister
Adelpha boeotia (C. & R. Felder, 1867) – Felder's sister
Adelpha cytherea (Linnaeus, 1758) – smooth-banded sister
Adelpha demialba (Butler, 1872) – white-spotted sister
Adelpha delinita Fruhstorfer, 1913 – Fruhstorfer's Sister or delineated sister
Adelpha diazi Beutelspacher, 1975 – Diaz's sister
Adelpha ethelda (Hewitson, 1867) – silver-banded sister
Adelpha epione (Godart, 1824) – white-barred sister
Adelpha fessonia (Hewitson, 1847) – Mexican sister, band-celled sister
Adelpha gelania (Godart, 1824) – Antillean sister
Adelpha heraclea (C. & R. Felder, 1867) – Heraclea sister
Adelpha hesterbergi Willmott & Hall, 1999
Adelpha leuceria (Druce, 1874) – orange-striped sister
Adelpha leucerioides Beutelspacher, 1975 – Veracruz sister
Adelpha malea (C. & R. Felder, 1861) – Venezuelan sister
Adelpha melona (Hewitson, 1847) – Mellona sister
Adelpha naxia (C. & R. Felder, 1867) – Naxia sister, three-part sister
Adelpha pollina Fruhstorfer, 1915
Adelpha salmoneus (Butler, 1866) – golden-banded sister
Adelpha syma (Godart, 1824) – Syma sister
Adelpha viola Fruhstorfer, 1913

See also

Doxocopa - A genus of butterflies whose females closely resemble Adelpha species

References

External links

images representing Adelpha at Consortium for the Barcode of Life

 
Nymphalidae of South America
Nymphalidae genera
Taxa named by Jacob Hübner
Limenitidinae